Hanna Hancharova (née Harchonak; ; born 11 February 1992) is a Belarusian individual and synchronised trampoline gymnast, representing her nation at international competitions.

At the 2015 European Games in Baku she won the gold medal in the individual event. She competed at world championships, including at the 2009, 2011, 2013, 2014 and 2015 Trampoline World Championships.

She has also competed in rhythmic gymnastics.  And she is currently married to fellow Belarusian and male trampoline gymnast Uladzislau Hancharou.

References

External links
 
 https://www.lequipe.fr/Aussi/AussiFicheAthlete12500000000054880.html
 http://dataolympic.com/athlete.php?athlete=hanna_harchonak&sport=gymnastics
 http://scores.espn.com/olympics/summer/2016/athletes/_/athlete/59141
 https://www.theguardian.com/sport/live/2016/aug/12/rio-olympics-2016-day-six-cycling-athletics-rowing-doping?page=with%3Ablock-57ae1993e4b0c23bfed88eb9
 http://www.gettyimages.com/pictures/hanna-harchonak-14708897#hanna-harchonak-of-belarus-competes-during-the-trampoline-gymnastics-picture-id589031480

1992 births
Living people
Place of birth missing (living people)
Belarusian female trampolinists
Olympic gymnasts of Belarus
Gymnasts at the 2016 Summer Olympics
Gymnasts at the 2015 European Games
Gymnasts at the 2019 European Games
European Games medalists in gymnastics
European Games gold medalists for Belarus
European Games bronze medalists for Belarus
Medalists at the Trampoline Gymnastics World Championships
21st-century Belarusian women